Retraction Watch is a blog that reports on retractions of scientific papers and on related topics. The blog was launched in August 2010 and is produced by science writers Ivan Oransky (Former Vice President, Editorial Medscape) and Adam Marcus (editor of Gastroenterology & Endoscopy News). Its parent organization is the Center for Scientific Integrity.

Scope 
Oransky and Marcus were motivated to launch Retraction Watch to increase the transparency of the retraction process. They observed that retractions of papers generally are not announced, that the reasons for retractions are not publicized, and that other researchers or the public who are unaware of the retraction may make decisions based on invalid results. Oransky described an example of a paper published in Proceedings of the National Academy of Sciences which reported a potential role for a drug against some types of breast cancers. Although the paper was later retracted, its retraction was not reported in media outlets that had earlier reported its positive conclusions, with a company having been established on the basis of the ultimately retracted conclusions.

Oransky and Marcus claim that retractions also provide a window into the self-correcting nature of science, can provide insight into cases of scientific fraud, and can "be the source of great stories that say a lot about how science is conducted". In January 2021, more than 50 studies have cited Retraction Watch as the scientific publishing community is exploring the impact of retracted papers.  During the COVID-19 pandemic, Retraction Watch maintained a separate list of retracted articles that added to misinformation about the pandemic, with additional research undertaken to analyse the subsequent pollution of further research as retracted papers are cited and used within scholarly research.

Impact 
Retraction Watch has demonstrated that retractions are more common than was previously thought. When Retraction Watch was launched, Marcus "wondered if we'd have enough material". It had been estimated that about 80 papers were retracted annually. However, in its first year, the blog reported on approximately 200 retractions. In October 2019 the Retraction Watch Database reached 20000 entries and as of September 2020 it contains 24064 items.

Funding 
Retraction Watch has been funded by a variety of sources, including donations and grants. They received grants from the John D. and Catherine T. MacArthur Foundation, the Helmsley Charitable Trust, and the Laura and John Arnold Foundation. The database of retractions was funded by a 400,000 dollar grant from the MacArthur Foundation received in 2015. They have partnered with the Center for Open Science, which is also funded by the Laura and John Arnold Foundation, to create a retraction database on the Open Science Framework.

See also 
 Replication crisis
 Center for Open Science

References

External links 
 

Science blogs
Medical controversies
Scientific misconduct
Media analysis organizations and websites
Error